Kanchumarru is a village in West Godavari district in the state of Andhra Pradesh in India. Aravalli railway Station and Manchili railway Station are the nearest train stations.

Demographics
 India census, Kanchumarru has a population of 2087 of which 1060 are males while 1027 are females. The average sex ratio of Kanchumarru village is 969. The child population is 182, which makes up 8.72% of the total population of the village, with sex ratio 896. In 2011, the literacy rate of Kanchumarru village was 63.88% when compared to 67.02% of Andhra Pradesh.

See also 
 Eluru

References 

Villages in West Godavari district